Emma's Diary is a British media company and parenting club that publishes pregnancy-related content through print and digital media. The company is also known for distributing free resources for prenatal and postnatal care.

History 
Emma’s Diary was founded by Nick Wells in 1991. The company went on to release a website and app to distribute its content digitally. 

Emma’s Diary publishes medical information, advice, and video content made for expecting parents. Emma’s Diary’s content is written according to NHS, NICE, and BFI guidelines.

The company also distributes free packs of baby care products at retailers such as Argos and Boots. It also provides a pregnancy guide compiled by GPs and midwives, which is distributed to GPs and midwives across the UK.

References 

1991 establishments in the United Kingdom
Publications established in 1991
Internet properties established in 1991